The National Museum of the United States Air Force has one of the world's largest collections with more than 360 aircraft and missiles on display.

List of aircraft

Early Years Gallery

 Avro 504K – reproduction
 Blériot XI monoplane
 Boeing P-12E 31-559
 Boeing P-26A Peashooter – reproduction
 Caproni Ca.36
 Consolidated PT-1 Trusty 26-233
 Curtiss 1911 Model D – reproduction
 Curtiss JN-4D "Jenny"
 Curtiss O-52 Owl 40-2763
 Curtiss P-6E Hawk 32-261 – painted as 32-240
 De Havilland DH-4 – reproduction
 Douglas O-38F 33‐324
 Eberhart S.E.5E
 Fairchild PT-19 42-34023
 Fokker Dr.I – reproduction
 Fokker D.VII – reproduction
 Halberstadt CL.IV
 Kellett K-2
 Kettering Bug (Aerial Torpedo)
 Martin MB-2 – reproduction
 Martin Model 139WAA – export version of B-10 bomber, painted in Air Corps livery
 Nieuport 28 C.1
 North American NA-64 – painted as a North American BT-9 or BT-14
 North American O-47B 39-112
 Northrop A-17 36-207
 Packard-Le Pere LUSAC-11
 Sopwith Camel – reproduction
 SPAD VII 94099
 SPAD XIII 16594
 Standard J-1
 Standard J-1 – displayed without fabric skin
 Thomas-Morse S-4C Scout
 Wright Military Flyer (1909) – reproduction

World War II Gallery

 Aeronca L-3B Grasshopper 42-36200
 Beechcraft AT-10 Wichita 42-35143
 Beech AT-11 Kansan 42-37493
 Beech GB-2 Traveler 23733 – painted as UC-43 39-139
 Bell P-39Q Airacobra 44-3887
 Bell P-63E Kingcobra 43-11728
 Boeing B-17F Flying Fortress 41-24485 "Memphis Belle"
 Boeing B-29 Superfortress 44-27297 "Bockscar" – weapon delivery aircraft used in atomic bombing on Nagasaki
 Bristol Beaufighter Mk Ic A19-43
 Cessna UC-78B Bobcat 42-71626
 Consolidated B-24D Liberator 42-72843 "Strawberry Bitch"
 Consolidated OA-10 Catalina 46595 – painted as 433879
 Curtiss AT-9 Jeep 41-12150
 Curtiss C-46D Commando 44-78018
 Curtiss P-36A Hawk 38-001 – painted as 38-086
 Curtiss Hawk 87A-3 (P-40E) AK987 – painted in Flying Tigers markings
 De Havilland DH.82A Tiger Moth
 De Havilland DH.98 Mosquito Mk.35 RS709 - painted as NS519
 Douglas A-20G Havoc 43-22200
 Douglas A-24B Banshee  42-54582
 Douglas B-18A Bolo 37-0469
 Douglas C-47D Skytrain 43-49507 – painted as 43-15213
 Fieseler Fi 156 C-1 Storch 4389
 Focke-Wulf Fw 190 D-9 601088
 Hawker Hurricane Mk.IIa 5390
 Interstate L-6 Grasshopper 43-2680
 Junkers Ju 88 D-1 430650 "Baksheesh"
 Kawanishi N1K2-Ja Shiden-Kai 5312
 Lockheed P-38L Lightning 44-53232
 Macchi MC.200 Saetta MM8146
 Martin B-26G Marauder 43-34581
 Messerschmitt Bf 109G-10 610824
 Messerschmitt Me 163B Komet 191095
 Messerschmitt Me 262A Schwalbe 501232
 Mitsubishi A6M2 Zero 51553
 Noorduyn UC-64A Norseman 44-70296
 North American A-36A Apache 42-83665
 North American F-10D Mitchell 43-3374 – painted as B-25B, Doolittle Raider's diorama
 North American P-51D Mustang 44-74936
 Northrop P-61C Black Widow 43-8353
 Piper L-4A Grasshopper 42‐36790 – painted as 42-36389
 Republic P-47D Thunderbolt 42-23278 "Fiery Ginger" – razorback
 Republic P-47D Thunderbolt 45-49167 "Five by Five" – bubble canopy
 Ryan PT-22 Recruit 41-15721
 Schweizer TG-3A 42-52988
 Seversky P-35 36-404
 Sikorsky R-4B Hoverfly 43-46506
 Sikorsky R-6A Hoverfly II 43-45379
 Stearman PT-13D Kaydet 42‐17800 – painted as N2S-5 60591
 Stinson L-5 Sentinel 42-98225 – painted as 42-98667
 Supermarine Spitfire Mk.Vc A58-246 – painted as MA863, traded by the Imperial War Museum Duxford for a B-24
 Supermarine Spitfire PR Mk.XI PA908 – painted as MB950
 Taylorcraft L-2M Grasshopper 43-26592 – painted as 43-26588
 Vultee BT-13 Valiant 42-90629
 Vultee L-1A Vigilant 41-19039
 Waco CG-4 45-27948
 Yokosuka MXY7 Ohka

Korean War Gallery

 Douglas A-26C Invader 44-35733
 Douglas C-124C Globemaster II 52-1066
 Lockheed F-80C Shooting Star 49-696
 Lockheed F-94A Starfire 49-2498
 Mikoyan-Gurevich MiG-15bis 2015357 – Soviet fighter of the Korean People's Air Force defected to Seoul, later flown by Chuck Yeager
 North American B-45C Tornado 48-0010
 North American F-82B Twin Mustang 44‐65162 – configured as an F-82G
 North American L-17A Navion 47‐1347
 North American F-86A Sabre 49-1067 – painted as 91236
 North American T-6D Mosquito 42-84216 – forward air control version of T-6 Texan trainer
 Republic F-84E Thunderjet 50-1143
 Sikorsky YH-5A 43-46620
 Sikorsky UH-19B Chickasaw 52-7587 "Hopalong"

Southeast Asia War Gallery

 Beech QU-22B 69-7699
 Bell UH-1P Iroquois 64-15476
 Boeing B-52D Stratofortress 56-0665
 Cessna YA-37A Dragonfly 62-5951
 Cessna O-1G Bird Dog 51-11917
 Cessna O-2A Skymaster 67-21331
 De Havilland Canada C-7 Caribou 62-4193
 Douglas A-1E Skyraider 52-132649 – Medal of Honor aircraft
 Douglas A-1H Skyraider 134600 – painted as 52-139738
 Douglas B-26K (A-26) Counter Invader 64‐17676
 Douglas RB-66B Destroyer 53-0475
 Fairchild C-123K Provider 56-4362 "Patches"
 General Dynamics F-111A Aardvark 67-0067
 Helio U-10D Super Courier 66-14360
 Kaman HH-43B Huskie 60-0263
 Lockheed EC-121D Warning Star 53-555 "Triple Nickel"
 LTV A-7D Corsair II 70-0970
 Martin EB-57B Canberra 52-1499
 McDonnell RF-101 Voodoo 56-166
 McDonnell Douglas F-4C Phantom II 64-0829 "SCAT XXVII"
 Mikoyan-Gurevich MiG-17F
 Mikoyan-Gurevich MiG-21PF
 North American F-100F Super Sabre 56-3837
 North American OV-10A Bronco 68-03787
 North American T-28B Trojan 140048
 Northrop YF-5A Freedom Fighter 59-4989
 Republic F-105D Thunderchief 60-0504 "Memphis Belle II"
 Republic F-105G Thunderchief 63-8320
 Sikorsky HH-3E 67-14709

Other aircraft

 Boeing Bird of Prey
 General Atomics YMQ-9 Reaper 02‐4002
 Lockheed Martin F-22A Raptor 91‐4003
 Northrop Grumman YRQ-4A Global Hawk 98‐2003
 Wright Modified “B” Flyer

Cold War Gallery

 Avro Canada CF-100 Canuck 18241
 Beech T-34 Mentor 53-3310
 Bell-Boeing CV-22B Osprey 99-0021
 Boeing B-1B Lancer 84-0051 "Boss Hog"
 Boeing RB-47H Stratojet 53-4299
 Boeing WB-50D Superfortress 49-0310
 Boeing KC-97L Stratofreighter 52-2630 "Zeppelinheim"
 Cessna U-3A 58-2124
 Cessna LC-126 49-1949
 Cessna T-37B Tweet 57-2289
 Cessna T-41A Mescalero 65-5251
 Convair B-36J "Peacemaker" 52-2220 
 Convair B-58 Hustler 59-2458 "Cowtown Hustler"
 Convair F-102A Delta Dagger 56-1416
 Convair F-106A Delta Dart 58-0787 – Cornfield Bomber
 De Havilland Canada U-6A Beaver 51-16501
 Douglas C-133A Cargomaster 56-2008
 Fairchild Republic A-10A Thunderbolt II 78-0681
 General Atomics RQ-1K Predator 94-3009
 General Dynamics EF-111A Raven 66-0057
 General Dynamics F-16A Fighting Falcon 81-0663
 Grumman HU-16 Albatross 51-5282
 Grumman J2F-6 Duck 33587 – painted as OA-12 8563
 Lockheed AC-130A Spectre 54-1630 "Azrael"
 Lockheed F-94C Starfire 50-980
 Lockheed F-104C Starfighter 56-914
 Lockheed F-117A Nighthawk 79-10781
 Lockheed SR-71A Blackbird 61-7976
 Lockheed T-33A 53-5974
 Lockheed U-2A 56-6722
 Martin RB-57D 53-3982
 McDonnell F-101B Voodoo 58-325
 McDonnell Douglas F-4G Phantom II 69-7263
 McDonnell Douglas RF-4C Phantom II 64-1047
 McDonnell Douglas F-15A Eagle 76-027
 Mikoyan-Gurevich MiG-19S
 Mikoyan-Gurevich MiG-23MS
 Mikoyan-Gurevich MiG-29A 2960516761
 North American F-82B Twin Mustang 44‐65168
 North American F-86D Sabre 50-0477
 North American F-86H Sabre 53-1352
 North American RF-86F Sabre 52-4492
 North American F-100D Super Sabre 55‐3754
 North American JT-28A Trojan 49-1494
 Northrop B-2A Spirit – static test mock-up
 Northrop F-89J Scorpion 52-1911 – painted as 53-2509
 Northrop AT-38B Talon 63-8172
 Panavia Tornado GR4 ZA374 "Miss Behavin'"
 Piper L-4A 42-36446 – painted as J-3C-65-8 NC42050
 Republic F-84F Thunderstreak 52-6526
 Republic RF-84K Thunderflash 52‐7259
 Sikorsky MH-53M 68‐10357
 Vertol CH-21B Workhorse 51-15857

Missile Gallery

 Boeing LGM-30A Minuteman IA
 Boeing LGM-30G Minuteman III
 Chrysler SM-78/PGM-19A Jupiter
 Douglas SM-75/PGM-17A Thor
 Martin Marietta LCG-118A Peacekeeper
 Martin Marietta SM-68A/HGM-25A Titan I
 Martin Marietta SM-68B/LGM-25C Titan II
 Thor-Agena A

Space Gallery

 Fairchild C-119 Flying Boxcar 51-8037
 Martin Marietta X-24A
 Martin Marietta X-24B 66‐13551
 North American X-15 56-6671
 Apollo 15 Command Module
 Gemini B experimental capsule for the Manned Orbiting Laboratory
 KH-7 Gambit reconnaissance satellite
 KH-8 Gambit 3
 KH-9 Hexagon
 Lockheed Martin Titan IVB Rocket
 Mercury spacecraft, production model
 Space Shuttle Crew Compartment Trainer (CCT-1)

Research and Development Gallery

 American Helicopter XH-26 Jet Jeep 50‐1841
 Avro Canada VZ-9 Avrocar 58-7055
 Bell P-59B Airacomet 44-22650
 Bell X-1B 48-1385
 Bell X-5 50-1838
 Bell XV-3 54‐148
 Bensen X-25A 68‐10770
 Boeing X-45
 Convair NC-131H 53‐7793
 Convair XF-92A 46-0682
 Douglas X-3 Stiletto 49‐2892
 Fisher P-75A Eagle 44-44553
 Grumman X-29A 82-0003
 LTV XC-142A 62‐5924
 Lockheed YF-12A 60-6935
 Lockheed NT-33A 51‐4120
 McDonnell XF-85 Goblin 46-0523
 McDonnell Douglas X-36
 North American X-10
 North American XB-70 Valkyrie 62‐001
 North American F-107A 55-5119
 Northrop Tacit Blue
 Northrop YF-23 87‐0800
 Northrop X-4 Bantam 46-0677
 Republic XF-84H 51-17059
 Republic YRF-84F FICON 49-2430
 Republic XF-91 Thunderceptor 46-0680
 Ryan X-13 Vertijet 54-1620
 Scaled Composites Long-EZ 03-0001

Global Reach Gallery

 Fairchild C-82 Packet 48-581
 Learjet C-21A 84-0064
 Lockheed C-130E Hercules 62-1787 "Spare 617"
 Lockheed C-141C Starlifter 66-0177 "Hanoi Taxi"

Presidential Gallery

 Aero Commander U-4B 55-4647
 Beech VC-6A 66-7943 "Lady Bird Special"
 Bell UH-13J Sioux 57-2728
 Boeing VC-137C 62-6000 SAM 26000
 Douglas VC-54C 42-107451 "Sacred Cow"
 Douglas VC-118 46-505 "Independence"
 Lockheed VC-121E 53-7885 "Columbine III"
 Lockheed VC-140B JetStar 61-2492
 North American T-39A Sabreliner 62-4478

Air park

 Boeing C-17 Globemaster III 87‐0025
 Boeing EC-135E ARIA 60-374 "Bird of Prey"
 Boeing KC-135R Stratotanker 60-0329
 Fairchild Republic A-10A Thunderbolt II
 Lockheed C-60A Lodestar 43‐16445
 Lockheed AC-130A Hercules 54-1626
 McDonnell Douglas F-15A Eagle 74-0117

Under restoration

 Boeing B-17D Flying Fortress 40-3097 The Swoose

Storage

 Beech C-45H Expeditor 52-10893
 Beechcraft PC-9 Mk II PT-3 – prototype for the T-6 program
 Beechcraft T-6A Texan II 06-3851
 Boeing B-17G Flying Fortress 42-32076 "Shoo Shoo Baby"
 Boeing NKC-135A 55-3123
 Boeing X-32
 Caquot Type R
 CASA 2.111H B.2I-29
 CASA 352L T.2B-244
 Convair L-13A 47-0323
 Convair XP-81 44‐91000
 Convair XP-81 44‐91001
 Corben Super Ace
 Curtiss A-25A Shrike
 Curtiss-Wright X-19 62-12198
 Dassault Mystere IVA
 Douglas B-23A Dragon 39-0037
 Douglas C-39 38-515
 Douglas O-46A 35‐179
 Douglas XB-42A Mixmaster 43-50224
 Douglas XB-43 Jetmaster 44-61509
 Ercoupe 415-C (YO-55) 86
 Fairchild PT-26
 Fairchild Republic T-46A 84-0493
 General Dynamics NF-16A Fighting Falcon 75-0750
 General Dynamics F-111F Aardvark 70-2390
 Hawker Beechcraft MC-12W Liberty
 Lavochkin La-17M
 Lockheed RB-34 Lexington AJ311
 Lockheed XF-90A 46-0688
 Luscombe 8A (UC-90)
 McDonnell Douglas F-15A Eagle 72‐0119 "Streak Eagle" – time-to-climb record holder
 McDonnell Douglas YF-4E Phantom II 62‐12200
 Mikoyan-Gurevich MiG-21
 Mikoyan-Gurevich MiG-23MLD
 Mikoyan-Gurevich MiG-25RB 020657
 Northrop YC-125B Raider 48-626 – painted as 48-622
 Pratt-Read TG-32 31523
 Sikorsky CH-3E 63-9676
 Sikorsky H-5G 48‐539
 Sikorsky S-51 51.22
 Sukhoi Su-22M-4 31203

References

External links

National Museum of the United States Air Force official website
Air Force Museum Foundation official website
List of all aircraft at the museum as of June 2016

National Museum
 
United States Air Force National Museum